The 1846 Grand Liverpool Steeplechase, later to become known as the Grand National Steeplechase, was the eighth official annual running of a handicap steeplechase. It took place at Aintree Racecourse near Liverpool on 4 March 1846 and attracted a then-record field of 22 entrants. It was won by the unconsidered outsider Pioneer.

Veluti, ridden by Jem Mason, a rider who had previously won the race in 1839 was sent off as the 11/2 favourite to win while the top weight of 12 stone 8 lbs was given to Firefly, the mount of Larry Byrne.

The course
The only contemporary report of the event was syndicated by the reporter of the Liverpool Mercury who recorded that the course consisted of thirty-one obstacles. This differed from the previous year in that a thorn fence had been installed in place of the wall jump at the distance chair in front of the stands. The competitors also now jumped three hurdles on the finishing straight where previously only one had stood. The fences that were noted were a large brook with a fence on the leading side, which was not yet officially described as Beecher's Brook and a high artificial thorn fence with a five foot wide and four foot deep water jump beyond.

Start - Just beyond the Melling Road. Fence 1 [17 on the second circuit] Plain good fence. Fence 2 [18] Plain good fence. Fence 3 [19] Plain good fence. Fence 4 [20] Plain good fence. Fence 5 [21] Large brook with a fence on the landing side. Fence 6 [22] A fence inclined to the left that takes the runners towards the Canal side. Fence 7 [23] A fence inclined to the left that takes the runners towards the Canal side. Fence 8 [24] A fence inclined to the left that takes the runners towards the Canal side. Fence 9 [25] A large water jump. Fence 10 [26] Out of the second field along the Canal. Fence 11 [27] Out of the third field along the Canal. Fence 12 [28] A fence into the Anchor Bridge Road. Fence 13 [29] An artificial hurdle leaving the training ground on the racecourse proper. Fence 14 [30] An artificial hurdle, replacing the wall at the distance judge's chair, which stood here the previous year. Fence 15 A high artificial thorn fence with a water jump five foot wide and four foot deep. Fence 16 A bank into the Melling Road. Fence 31 An artificial hurdle adjacent to the water jump.

Finishing order

The race

The course for this race was incorrectly flagged with the result that as much as half a mile was added to the distance.

Peter Simple led for the majority of the first circuit, which four of the competitors failed to negotiate. The Scavenger refused the first jump and did not continue, Mameluke and Hornihihharriho failed to reach Becher's Brook for the first time when the pair collided at an early jump while where the latter's rider, Lee-Carter suffered a heavy facial wound. Lancet's rider, William McDonough, was knocked from his horse by a mounted spectator as the field were turning to enter the race course proper and was badly bruised. 

The second circuit saw many of the runners meet with accidents as Peter Simple fell to leave Culverthorpe in the lead. Last year's winner, Cure-All was pulled up by his rider when it became apparent that he would not repeat his success and Perambulator soon did the same, Golden Pippen bolted off the course. Regalia, Troubadour, Carlow, Brenda, Tinderbox and Lady Grey all fell before the survivors came back into sight of the spectators in the stands.

Only eight runners remained in the race when they came back onto the race course and when the stated distance was completed Veluti led from Culverthorpe. Veluti broke down and had to be pulled up, leaving Culverthorpe to jump the final flight in the lead only to be caught on the run to the finish line by the rank outsider Pioneer.

Pioneer won the race by three lengths with Culverthorpe second, three lengths in front of Switcher in third. Although an unconsidered outsider, Pioneer was quoted at a price of 200/10 the evening before the race although few, if any bets were known to have been struck and few bookmakers offered a price. He proved himself to be a very good horse by winning a prestigious race at Leamington Spa the following week. His rider, William Taylor was a twenty-seven-year-old vet and was one of nine riders making their Grand National debut while the owner, a Mr Adams had been very clear before the race that he would not risk a penny of his own money on his own horse and indeed had made no effort to have the horse trained for racing.

At the time, Allen McDonough and Horatio Powell were both taking a record eighth ride in the race, however the 1836 race, in which Powell took part was discounted as an official National in the 1860s and the races of 1837 and '38, in which McDonough took part were also discounted during the Second World War.

References

Grand National, 1846
 1846
Grand National
19th century in Lancashire
March 1846  sports events